Klin (sk. Klin, pl. Starorobociański Wierch) is a peak in the Western Tatras, on the border between Slovakia and Poland. Its summit is at 2,176 m AMSL. It is the highest peak in Polish Western Tatras. The foreground is a classic split ridge or doppelgrat, spreading under tension due to deep erosion in the valleys either side. The finest example in the Tatra is between Kamienista and Smreczynski Wierch nearby.

Klin
Klin
Poland–Slovakia border
International mountains of Europe
Western Tatras
Mountains of the Western Carpathians